The Academy Drama School (often referred to as the Academy) was a British drama school in London. It was founded in 1985 and closed in 2007.

History

The Academy was founded by Tim Reynolds and his wife Judith in 1985 as the Evening Academy of Dramatic Art (EADA). They saw the need for a drama school offering 'professional' instruction for those with the desire and 'talent', but not the money or local authority grant to pay for it, although they still had to pay fees every term. Accordingly, they put together the Full Time Evening Course, a two-year (six-term) programme which enabled students to earn a living from a daytime job, while pursuing an intensive drama training at the school in the evenings and weekends.

The school was initially located at cold and damp premises in Oxford Street, but the rapid rise in demand for the Evening Course soon necessitated a move to its long-term location in Whitechapel. Which at the time of moving in was in an unfinished and dangerous condition and resembled a building site.

The Full Time Evening Course was always the core of the school's activities, but the Academy also established a one-year (three-term) Postgraduate Course and a one-year (three-term) drama school access course ('The Foundation Course') which culminated in a LAMDA Foundation Certificate in Acting (Level 3). A one-year (three-term) Acting with English Course was later created to help talented students with a lack of higher English skills. For these last three courses, classes were taught during the daytime.

The Academy also offered a variety of shorter courses, some oriented towards leisure but all offering the same standard of teaching as on the main vocational courses.

The school's patrons included Richard Briers, Edward de Souza and Ron Moody.

The school had its own theatre space on-site (The Andrew Sketchley Theatre), in which all in-house productions during the training were performed. However, those graduating the Full Time and Postgraduate courses had their final production presented at a London fringe venue. There was also a showcase staged for these graduates, which was presented to an invited audience of agents and casting directors at a West End theatre (venues for this included the Fortune Theatre and the Duchess Theatre).

Tim Reynolds died in 2006, and after 20 years of struggle, the Academy was finally forced into receivership in the face of mounting financial difficulties.

A statement on the school's official website read: "Following the tragic death of the principal, Tim Reynolds, the Academy closed in January 2007. His widow, Judith would like to thank everyone in the industry and most especially the graduate students who have been so supportive. Tim was very proud of them and their success, they are his memorial."

The Actor Works
On the closure of the Academy, then principal Daniel Brennan established a new drama school in Wapping, called  Actor Works. The new school offers a full-time evening course, a foundation course in acting and a postgraduate course in a similar tradition to the Academy. A new Part-Time acting course began in January 2007, and various part-time specialist courses for professional actors started in 2009.

At the inception of The Actor Works on 18 December 2006, all mid-course Academy students were offered places and given the opportunity to complete their training at the new school. The great majority accepted a place at The Actor Works. Many former Academy tutors also joined the staff of the new establishment. The school is now in its sixth year of existence, having auditioned and accepted full complements of new Full-Time students each year.

Alumni

Graduates of the Academy's various courses have gone on to work for esteemed theatre institutions such as the Royal Shakespeare Company and the Royal National Theatre, or in successful plays and musicals in London's West End and on national/international tours with companies such as Graeae, Chapterhouse and Pendle Productions. Others have appeared in films, or in television shows ranging from Doctor Who to Little Britain to Band of Brothers.

Educational institutions established in 1985
Educational institutions disestablished in 2007
Arts organisations based in the United Kingdom
Drama schools in London
1985 establishments in England
2007 disestablishments in England